The Test of Love is a 1999 American television drama film directed by Larry Peerce and starring Roma Downey that aired on CBS on December 1, 1999. It was produced by Carla Singer Productions and Hamdon Entertainment.

Plot
Cassie and David Whitman are living happy and peaceful life, raising together a teenage son; Kevin. The day after their 20th wedding anniversary, David has a business travel. The plane he flies with crashes. Everybody but David dies, meanwhile he goes into the coma. The woman sitting next to him was checked in under the same last name, which makes the insurance company believe she was his wife. Trying to explain this, Cassie discovers a shocking truth of David's double life, the fruit of which is a pre-teenage daughter.

Cast
 Roma Downey as Cassie Whitman  
 William Russ as David Whitman
 Kristina Malota as Erika Whitman   
 Jamie Rose as Judith Evans  
 Jed Millar as Kevin Whitman
and Penny Johnson Jerald, Steve Anderson, J. Scott Bronson, Tracy Chase, Gérman Contreras, Fredric Cook, Neblis Francois, Kim Landry, Christopher Miller, Joey Miyashima, Anne Kathryn Parma, Alan Peterson, Martine Singer, Anne Sward, Shauna Thompson, Scott Jackson Tompkins, L. Melvin Ward, Scott Wilkinson.

References

External links

1999 television films
1999 films
1999 drama films
CBS network films
1990s English-language films